The 2011 Night of Champions was the fifth annual Night of Champions professional wrestling pay-per-view (PPV) event produced by WWE. It took place on September 18, 2011, at the First Niagara Center in Buffalo, New York. It was WWE's first PPV event to be held following the dissolution of the original brand extension. The concept of the show was that every championship in the company at the time was defended.

Eight matches took place at the event, seven of which were broadcast live on pay-per-view. The event featured multiple main events, with Triple H defeating CM Punk in a No Disqualification match with a stipulation where had Triple H lost, he would have no longer been Chief Operating Officer of WWE, John Cena defeating Alberto Del Rio for the WWE Championship, and Mark Henry defeating Randy Orton for the World Heavyweight Championship.

The event garnered 161,000 buys, down from 165,000 buys the previous year.

Production

Background
Night of Champions was an annual pay-per-view (PPV) event produced by WWE since 2007—in April 2011, the promotion ceased going by its full name of World Wrestling Entertainment, with "WWE" becoming an orphaned initialism. The 2011 event was the fifth event in the Night of Champions chronology. It took place on September 18, 2011, at the First Niagara Center in Buffalo, New York; it was the first PPV to be held following the end of the first brand extension in August. As per the theme of the event, every championship promoted by WWE at the time was defended. These included the WWE Championship, the World Heavyweight Championship, the Intercontinental Championship, the United States Championship, the WWE Tag Team Championship, and the WWE Divas Championship.

Storylines
Night of Champions featured professional wrestling matches involving different wrestlers from pre-existing scripted feuds, plots, and storylines that played out on WWE's television programs. Wrestlers portrayed villains or heroes as they followed a series of events that built tension and culminated in a wrestling match or series of matches.

The main rivalry involved the former champion CM Punk and the Chief Operating Officer of WWE Triple H in a No Disqualification match. After Punk became the WWE Champion at SummerSlam 2011, he was attacked by Kevin Nash. Kevin Nash had stated that Triple H had sent him a message telling him to take out the winner regardless of who it was, which gave Alberto Del Rio ample time to cash in his Money in the Bank contract and become WWE Champion. A vindictive CM Punk would take his aggression out on Nash, Triple H, and his wife Stephanie McMahon through constant verbal insults, especially to Triple H whom Punk believed to have instigated Nash's attack. On the August 29 episode of Raw, Punk and Nash were scheduled to be in a match at Night of Champions, but at the end of the show, Triple H had the match changed to feature CM Punk against himself. The following week on Raw, Triple H, after discovering that it was Nash that used his cell phone to make the text, fired him and changed the stipulation to be no disqualification. Punk in turn added his own stipulation that if Triple H lost to Punk, Triple H would have to resign as the COO of WWE.

Another rivalry involved the WWE Champion Alberto Del Rio defending his title against former champion John Cena. The previous month at SummerSlam, Cena had lost to CM Punk, who also had a claim to the WWE Championship. After the match, Money in the Bank winner Alberto Del Rio cashed in his contract after Punk was assaulted by Kevin Nash and won the WWE Championship. On the August 22 episode of Raw, Punk and Cena faced each other to determine Del Rio's opponent, with Cena winning and gaining the right to a rematch after some interference from Nash.

Event

Preliminary matches
The actual pay-per-view opened with Air Boom (Evan Bourne and Kofi Kingston) defending the WWE Tag Team Championship against Awesome Truth (The Miz and R-Truth). At the end of the match, the referee was unaware that Miz tagged in Truth. While the referee was arguing with Truth, Miz executed a Skull Crushing Finale on Bourne for the pin, however, the referee and Truth were arguing and Bourne kicked out before the referee was able to count. A frustrated Miz shoved the referee down causing a disqualification, thus Air Boom retained the title. Truth helped the referee up and then shoved him to the ground.

Next, Cody Rhodes defended the WWE Intercontinental Championship against Ted DiBiase. In the climax, DiBiase removed Rhodes' facial mask. As DiBiase tried to strike Rhodes with the mask, Rhodes pinned Dibiase with a roll up whilst holding his tights to retain the title. 

After that, Dolph Ziggler (accompanied by Vickie Guerrero) defended the WWE United States Championship against Jack Swagger, Alex Riley and John Morrison in a Fatal Four-way match. In the end, as Swagger performed a Gutwrench Powerbomb on Morrison, Ziggler threw Swagger out of the ring and pinned Morrison to retain the title.

In the fourth match, Randy Orton defended the World Heavyweight Championship against Mark Henry. Throughout the match, Henry began to target Orton's knee. In the closing moments, Henry countered an RKO attempt and executed a World's Strongest Slam on Orton to win the title. Following the match, Henry was congratulated on finally winning the World Heavyweight Championship after 15 years. 

In the fifth match, Kelly Kelly (with Eve Torres) defended the WWE Divas Championship against Beth Phoenix (accompanied by Natalya. Towards the end of the match, Phoenix superplexed Kelly. Kelly recovered and performed a roll-up on Phoenix to retain the title.

Next, John Cena faced Alberto Del Rio for the WWE Championship (accompanied by Ricardo Rodriguez). John Cena made an entrance in Del Rio's Ferrari F430 before the match. During the match, Del Rio applied the Cross Armbreaker only for Cena to counter Del Rio. As Rodriguez stood on the ring apron and tried to interfere, Cena knocked him off. In the climax, Cena executed an Attitude Adjustment and applied the STF on Del Rio, who submitted, to win the title.

Main event
In the final match of the night, Triple H put his job as COO of the WWE on the line against CM Punk in a No Disqualification match. Punk attacked Triple H during Triple H's entrance to start the match. The match spilled on the outside as the momentum kept shifting between the two competitors, and Triple H targeted Punk's legs. Back in the ring they kept trading shots and matched each other move for move. The action spilled outside again and both of them fought in the crowd and through the arena, with Punk throwing garbage cans at Triple H. Near the entrance ramp they both used the set display to attack one another, and Punk used aerial maneuvers and kicks to attack Hunter. Back in the ring CM Punk repeatedly used a steel chair to knock down Triple H and taunt him with his own crotch-chop. Triple H countered with a swift Spinebuster, and as they both fought outside Triple H went for the legs again using the ring post to inflict damage and nailing Punk with a chair himself and taunting him with a crotch-chop of his own. As Triple H went for a Figure-Four Leg Lock on the outside Punk kicked him into the steel steps. Punk then nailed the COO with a roundhouse kick and set him up on the announce table, following which he performed an elbow drop on Triple H from the top turnbuckle, driving him through the table. As they went back in the ring, The Miz and R-Truth came to the ring and attacked both competitors, nailing Triple H with a Skull Crushing Finale and CM Punk with a What's Up (Leaping Reverse STO). They placed Punk on Triple H but to their shock Triple H kicked out at two. They then started attacking the referee. Punk and Triple H then attacked Miz and Truth as John Laurinaitis came down ringside trying to restore order. Triple H nailed Punk with a Pedigree, but as he covered him Laurinaitis diverted the attention of the referee towards the other referee knocked out by Miz and Truth preventing him from making the pinfall. Punk recovered and knocked out Triple H with a G.T.S. (Go To Sleep). But as he covered him going for the pin, R-Truth once again attacked him breaking up the fall at two. Punk had had enough and knocked Truth out with a crushing Go To Sleep outside the ring. He then attempted an aerial attack on Triple H, jumping from the top rope, but Triple H countered with a kick to the abdomen, and nailed a devastating second Pedigree. Triple H covered him but to everyone's shock the resilient Punk still kicked out at two. Laurinaitis was seen texting someone from ringside, and as Punk and Triple H continued to fight, Kevin Nash came to the ring from the crowd and attacked them both. He then tried to nail Triple H with a Jacknife Powerbomb but Punk prevented the attack on his competitor. In retaliation, Nash attacked Punk and laid him out with a thunderous Jacknife Powerbomb. He then turned his attention to Triple H, but before he could do any damage, Triple H hit Nash with a sledgehammer outside the ring. He then reentered the ring and executed a devastating third Pedigree and pinned Punk to win the match and retain his job as COO.

Reception
Night of Champions 2011 received mixed to positive reviews by the critics, with Dave Meltzer saying that the WWE had put on two awesome pay-per-views, Money in the Bank (2011) and SummerSlam (2011) and Night of Champions could not follow them, but that it was an entertaining event nonetheless. The Sun'''s Rob McNichol praised the match between John Cena and Alberto Del Rio, stating that Alberto proved to be a true champion, pulling off a valiant effort against Cena, but was too much to overcome, but also criticized the end, and awarded the match an 8.5 out of 10. McNichol also praised the Randy Orton vs Mark Henry match, saying that pulling Mark Henry to the main event status is a thing that the WWE had to do a long time ago, and adding that the match was better than expected, with Randy trying to take the man off his feet, and Henry dominating Orton from the beginning to the end, awarding the match an 8 out of 10. He gave a positive review to the No Disqualification match between CM Punk and Triple H, stating that the match turned into a good brawl in the first fifteen minutes, but with all the interferences it seemed more a TNA match than a WWE main event match, but that the final sequences, with Punk kicking out cleanly to the pedigree made that a very entertaining match after all, awarding it a great 9.5 out of 10. Overall, he gave the event a 9.0 out of 10.

Aftermath
The following night on Raw'', Triple H announced the first ever Triple Threat Hell in a Cell match for the WWE Championship with John Cena defending the title against Alberto Del Rio, who was granted his rematch clause after losing the title at Night of Champions and CM Punk, who never got his rematch. Del Rio won the match after pinning Punk after hitting him with a lead pipe and locking Cena out of the cell. The Miz and R-Truth attacked the three after the match. A few weeks later, Triple H fired Miz and Truth. John Laurinaitis rehired Miz and Truth and Miz and Truth defeated the team of Triple H and CM Punk at Vengeance after interference by Kevin Nash.

Mark Henry attacked Jim Ross and Jerry Lawler the next night because of Ross and Lawler never believing that he could become World champion. SmackDown General Manager Theodore Long announced later that night that Henry would defend the title against Orton in a Hell in a Cell match. Henry would retain the title. Big Show returned from injury to challenge Henry for the title at Vengeance, where the match ended in a no contest after the ring broke, and at Survivor Series when Henry would get himself disqualified. Henry lost the title to Show in a Chairs match at TLC.

After Sheamus Brogue Kicked Christian at the pay-per-view, they fought at Hell in a Cell and Vengeance with Sheamus winning both matches.

Beth Phoenix was able to defeat Kelly Kelly at Hell in a Cell to become the Divas champion.

Results

References

External links
Official Night of Champions site

2011
Events in Buffalo, New York
Professional wrestling in Buffalo, New York
2011 WWE pay-per-view events
September 2011 events in the United States
es:WWE Night of Champions#2011